Qingyuan is a district in the municipal region of Ji'an, Jiangxi province, People's Republic of China. 
Qingyuan comprises the right (east) bank of the Gan River opposite the JiAn municipal government centre, and stretches southeast in a rather narrow strip of territory up to Mount Dawu (大乌山, 1204m) on the border with Ganzhou Municipality.

Administration 

The district executive, legislature and judiciary are right on the riverfront in Hedong Subdistrict, Ji'an, along with the CPC and Public Security branches.

2 subdistricts (街道, ่jie dao) 

Hedong
Binjiang

5 Towns (镇, zhen) 
Tianyu
Futan
Zhixia
Xinxu
Futian - site of the 1930 Futian Incident, is upgraded from township
Wenpi is upgraded from township

1 Ethic Township (民族乡, minzu xiang) 
She Donggu

Economy
The supermarket chains Ganyuting and Guoguang have their headquarters in the district.

Education

Jinggangshan University is located in this district.

Secondary schools:
 Jinggangshan University Affiliated High School

References

External links 
  Government site - 

Qingyuan
County-level divisions of Jiangxi